This list includes any stately home, historic house, museum or other property in the care of the autonomous state and territory branches of the National Trust of Australia. Many, but not all, of these are open to the public.

Australian Capital Territory

Lanyon Homestead (staffed by the Trust, but owned by the ACT Government)

New South Wales

Ahimsa, Cheltenham
Bedervale, Braidwood (contents only)
Cooma Cottage, Yass
Dalwood House, Branxton (grounds of Wyndham Estate)
Dundullimal, Dubbo
Everglades Gardens, Leura
Experiment Farm Cottage, Harris Park
Grossmann House and Brough House, Maitland
Harper's Mansion, Berrima
Lindesay, Darling Point
Miss Porter's House, Newcastle
Miss Traill's House & Garden, Bathurst
Norman Lindsay Gallery, Faulconbridge
Old Government House, Parramatta
Retford Park, Bowral
Riversdale, Goulburn
Saumarez Homestead, Armidale
S. H. Ervin Gallery, The Rocks
St Ignatius Convent School, Wentworth (by appointment only)
Sir Henry Parkes School of Arts, Tenterfield
Tomago House, Tomago 
Vienna, Hunters Hill
Wirrimbirra Sanctuary, between Tahmoor and Bargo
Woodford Academy, Woodford

See also
Historic Houses Trust of New South Wales

Northern Territory

Borroloola Police Station, Borroloola
Burnett House, Darwin
Daly Waters Aviation Complex, near Daly Waters
Hartley Street School, Alice Springs
Jones Store, Newcastle Waters
Katherine Railway Station, Katherine
Magistrates House, Darwin
Stuart Town Gaol, Alice Springs
O'Keeffe Residence, Katherine
Pine Creek Museum, Pine Creek
Pine Creek Railway Precinct, Pine Creek
Tuxworth Fullwood House, Tennant Creek

Queensland

 Brennan and Geraghtys Store, Maryborough
 Currumbin Wildlife Sanctuary, Gold Coast
 Grandchester railway station, Grandchester, Queensland
 Hou Wang Chinese Temple and Museum, Atherton
 Cooktown Museum (formerly James Cook Historical Museum), Cooktown
 National Trust Heritage Centre, Townsville
 Royal Bull's Head Inn, Toowoomba
 Stock Exchange Arcade, Charters Towers
 Wolston House, Wacol
 Zara Clark Museum, Charters Towers

South Australia

1910 Congregational Church, Keith (by appointment only)
Ayers House, Adelaide
Beaumont House, Beaumont
Cape Jaffa Lighthouse, Kingston SE
Ceduna Museum, Ceduna
Cobdogla Irrigation Museum, Barmera
Collingrove Homestead, Angaston
Courthouse Museum, Millicent, Millicent
Cowell Agricultural Museum, Cowell
Cowell Historical Museum, Cowell
Crystal Brook Heritage Centre, Crystal Brook
Customs House, Robe
Early Settler's Cottage, Keith (by appointment only)
Encounter Coast Discovery Centre, Victor Harbor
Gamble Cottage, Blackwood
Glencoe Woolshed, Mount Gambier
Goolwa Museum, Goolwa
Hope Cottage Museum, Kingscote, Kangaroo Island
Hughes Pump House, Moonta
Jamestown Railway Station and Goods Shed, Jamestown
Koppio Smithy Museum, Koppio
Maitland Museum, Maitland
Matta House, Kadina
Mill Cottage, Port Lincoln
Millicent Museum, Millicent
Minlaton Museum, Minlaton
Miners Cottage and Heritage Garden, Moonta
Moonta Mines Public School, Moonta
Moonta Mines Sweets Shop, Moonta
Mount Laura Station, Whyalla
Napper's Accommodation House, Barmera
Old Centenary Hall, Balaklava
Old Council Chambers, Cleve (by appointment only)
Old Highercombe Hotel, Tea Tree Gully
Old Telegraph Station, Gawler
Old Police Station and Courthouse, Auburn
Old Police Station, Clare
Old Railway Superintendent's Cottage, Goolwa (by appointment only)
Old Wool and Grain Store, Beachport
Olivewood, Renmark
Overland Corner Hotel, Overland Corner
Penneshaw Maritime and Folk Museum, Penneshaw, Kangaroo Island
Petticoat Lane, Penola
Police Station and Courthouse, Strathalbyn
Police Station and Courthouse Complex, Melrose
Port Elliot Railway Station, Port Elliot
Port Pirie Railway Station and Customs House, Port Pirie
The Sheep's Back, Naracoorte
Stangate House and Garden, Mount Lofty (by appointment only)
Streaky Bay Museum, Streaky Bay
Wallaroo Heritage and Nautical Museum, Wallaroo
Wellington Courthouse, Wellington
Willunga Courthouse Museum, Willunga
Winn's Bakehouse, Coromandel Valley

Tasmania

Clarendon, near Evandale
Franklin House, Launceston
Home Hill, Devonport
Latrobe Court House, Latrobe
Oak Lodge (Richmond, Tasmania), Richmond
Old Umbrella Shop, Launceston
Penghana, Queenstown
Penitentiary Chapel and Criminal Courts, Hobart
Runnymede, Hobart
White House, Westbury

Victoria

Barwon Grange, Geelong
Barwon Park, Winchelsea
Como House, South Yarra
Dow's Pharmacy, Chiltern
Federal Standard Printing Works, Chiltern
Government House, Melbourne (tours by appointment)
Gulf Station, Yarra Glen
Labassa, Caulfield
Lake View Homestead, Chiltern
La Trobe's Cottage, Melbourne
McCrae Homestead, McCrae
Polly Woodside, Melbourne
Old Melbourne Gaol, Melbourne
Mooramong, Skipton
Mulberry Hill, Langwarrin South - donated to the Trust in 1984 on the death of Joan Lindsay. It is open to the public on weekends and some weekdays.
Portable Iron Houses, South Melbourne
Portarlington Mill, Portarlington
Rippon Lea Estate, Elsternwick
The Heights, Geelong

Western Australia 
Bridgedale, Bridgetown
Central Greenough
East Perth Cemeteries, East Perth
Ellensbrook, Yebble
Goldfields Pipeline
Mangowine Homestead, Nungarin
No. 1 Pump Station, Mundaring
Old Blythewood, Pinjarra
Old Farm, Strawberry Hill, Albany
Tranby House, Maylands
Warden Finnerty's Residence, Coolgardie
Wonnerup House and Old School, Busselton
Woodbridge, West Midland
York Courthouse Complex, York

National Trust